For the 1983 Vuelta a España, the field consisted of 100 riders; 59 finished the race.

By rider

By nationality

References

1983 Vuelta a España
1983